Chaetocladium elegans is a species of fungi in the family Mucoraceae.

References

External links 
 

  
 Chaetocladium elegans at Mycobank

Fungi described in 1890
Mucoraceae
Taxa named by Friedrich Wilhelm Zopf